Han Hyun-sun (born 24 July 1973) is a South Korean basketball player. She competed in the women's tournament at the 1996 Summer Olympics.

References

1973 births
Living people
South Korean women's basketball players
Olympic basketball players of South Korea
Basketball players at the 1996 Summer Olympics
Asian Games medalists in basketball
Asian Games gold medalists for South Korea
Basketball players at the 1994 Asian Games
Medalists at the 1994 Asian Games